Whitcomb is a ghost town in Greenbrier County, West Virginia, United States. Whitcomb appeared on USGS maps as late as 1935.

References

Geography of Greenbrier County, West Virginia
Ghost towns in West Virginia